Robert 'Bob' Borsley (born 1959) is a male retired British sport shooter.

Sport shooting career
He represented England and won two bronze medals in the trap singles and trap pairs with John Grice, at the 1994 Commonwealth Games in Victoria, British Columbia, Canada. Four years later he represented England in the trap singles, at the 1998 Commonwealth Games in Kuala Lumpur, Malaysia.

References

1959 births
Living people
British male sport shooters
Commonwealth Games medallists in shooting
Commonwealth Games bronze medallists for England
Shooters at the 1994 Commonwealth Games
Shooters at the 1998 Commonwealth Games
20th-century British people
Medallists at the 1994 Commonwealth Games
Medallists at the 1998 Commonwealth Games